Michel Côté may refer to:

 Michel Côté (actor), an actor in Quebec
 Michel Côté (MP) (born 1942), Canadian Member of Parliament and cabinet minister for the Progressive Conservative Party of Canada
 Michel Côté (MNA) (born 1937), member of the National Assembly of Quebec for the Liberal Party of Quebec

See also
Michael Cote (disambiguation)